Esbly is a commune in the Seine-et-Marne department in the Île-de-France region in north-central France.

Demographics
Inhabitants of Esbly are called Esblygeois in French.

Education
There are four primary schools in Esbly: École maternelle Les Couleurs (preschool), École maternelle des Champs-Forts (preschool), École élémentaire du Centre (elementary school), and École élémentaire des Champs-Forts (elementary school). There is one junior high school, Collège Louis Braille.

See also
Communes of the Seine-et-Marne department

References

External links

Home page 
1999 Land Use, from IAURIF (Institute for Urban Planning and Development of the Paris-Île-de-France région) 

Communes of Seine-et-Marne